Camblesforth is a village and civil parish in the Selby District of North Yorkshire, England. According to the 2001 Census the civil parish had a population of 1,526, increasing to 1,568 at the 2011 Census. It was historically part of the West Riding of Yorkshire until 1974.

It has a Methodist Chapel (1894) which is used for Parish Council and other meetings, and two public houses, the Comus Inn and the Black Dog.

History

The place-name 'Camblesforth' is first attested in the Domesday Book of 1086, where it appears as Camelesforde and Canbesford. The first element may be a river name corresponding to the Welsh camlais meaning 'crooked stream', so the name may mean 'ford on a crooked stream'.

Merleswein the Sheriff was Lord of the Manor of Camblesforth in 1066. Ralph Paynell became Lord of the Manor in 1086  after Camblesforth suffered the Harrowing of the North by William the Conqueror to subjugate Northern England.

In 1224, the Lordship passed through the Paynell family to the de Brus family. Subsequently, Sibil de Beaulieu (d.1301) daughter of Laderina de Brus, Lady of Camblesforth and granddaughter of Peter de Brus, Lord of Skelton married Sir Miles Stapleton (d.1314). The Lordship stayed in the Stapleton family until Henry Edwarde Paine acquired the Lordship from Henry Stapleton, 9th Lord Beaumont in 1893. The Lordship was in the hands of his Mr. Paine's trustees from his death in 1917 to 1956 when it was acquired by Alma Grossman. Richard Gregg, Order of St John, whose ancestors were related to the Brus and Stapleton family through marriage, became the 32nd Lord of Camblesforth when he acquired the Lordship from Ms. Grossman's trustees in 2015. The current heir to the Lordship is his son, Benjamin R. Gregg.

Camblesforth Hall, the seat of Sir Charles Blois, Bart., is the oldest standing structure in Camblesforth. The Grade I hall was built .

The village was the centre of national public and media attention in July 2004, after the bodies of two 27-year-old twin sisters (Claire and Diane Sanderson) were found at a flat on Millfield Drive. It was the home of Claire Sanderson, who shared the flat with her fiancé Mark Hobson. On 18 April 2005, at Leeds Crown Court, Hobson admitted both of the murders as well as those of James and Joan Britton, a couple in their eighties who were found beaten to death in the village of Strensall near York. Hobson, a binman who had a history of violence, drug abuse and alcoholism, was sentenced to life imprisonment the following month with a recommendation that he should never be released.

During the 2012 Summer Olympics Camblesforth was a relay point for the Olympic Torch.

Governance
An electoral ward with the same name exists. This ward stretches south to Carlton with a total population taken at the 2011 census of 4,317.

References

External links

 
 Camblesforth Parish Council
 Camblesforth Community Primary School
 Camblesforth Village Plan

Civil parishes in North Yorkshire
Selby District
Villages in North Yorkshire